Kalle Kaijomaa (born June 1, 1984) is a Finnish professional ice hockey defenceman who is currently an unrestricted free agent. He most recently played for Schwenninger Wild Wings of the Deutsche Eishockey Liga (DEL).

Playing career
Undrafted, Kaijomaa has previously played in his native Finnish Liiga, with SaiPa, JYP Jyväskylä, Tappara, Espoo Blues and HC TPS. At the conclusion of his loan with TPS from the Blues, Kaijomaa left Finland as a free agent for the second time in his career, signing a one-year deal with German-based club, Schwenninger Wild Wings of the top flight DEL on May 6, 2016.

Following an injury plagued 2018–19 season, his third with the Wild Wings, Kaijomaa left Schwenninger at the conclusion of his contract.

References

External links

1984 births
Espoo Blues players
Finnish ice hockey defencemen
JYP Jyväskylä players
Living people
Mikkelin Jukurit players
SaiPa players
SaPKo players
Schwenninger Wild Wings players
Tappara players
HC TPS players
Växjö Lakers players
People from Joensuu
Sportspeople from North Karelia